Patricia Consolatrix Hilliard Robertson (March 12, 1963 – May 24, 2001) was an American physician and a NASA astronaut. She died in a plane crash the year before she would have flown to the International Space Station.

Biography
She was born in Indiana, Pennsylvania to Ilse Hilliard and the late Harold Hilliard of Homer City. She was married to Scott Robertson.

Education
She graduated from Homer-Center High School, Homer City, Pennsylvania in 1980. She received a Bachelor of Science degree in biology from Indiana University of Pennsylvania in 1985, and a medical degree from the Medical College of Pennsylvania in 1989. She completed a three-year residency in family medicine in 1992 and was certified by the American Board of Family Medicine in the same year. She completed a two-year fellowship in space medicine at the University of Texas Medical Branch and NASA Johnson Space Center in 1997, which included the Aerospace Medicine Primary Course at Brooks Air Force Base.

Medical career
After completing her training in Family Medicine in 1992, Robertson joined a group practice, Elk Valley Medical Center in Girard, Pennsylvania. She was on the staff of Saint Vincent Medical Center in Erie, Pennsylvania for three years where she served as the clinical coordinator for medical student training, and also provided training and supervision for resident physicians. In 1995, Robertson was one of two fellows selected to study aerospace medicine at the University of Texas Medical Branch, Galveston, and at the Johnson Space Center, Houston. While enrolled as a Space Medicine Fellow, Robertson completed a research project where she studied eccentric and concentric resistive exercise countermeasures for space flight. Robertson also served as a member of the faculty at UTMB in the departments of Family Medicine and Emergency Medicine. In 1997, Robertson joined the Flight Medicine Clinic at Johnson Space Center, where she provided health care for astronauts and their families, and served as Chairman of the Bone, Muscle, and Exercise Integrated Product Team.

Robertson was a multiengine rated flight instructor and avid aerobatic pilot. In her free time, she enjoyed flight instructing, aerobatics, and flying with her husband. She had accumulated over 1,500 hours of flight time.

NASA career 
Selected by NASA in June 1998, Robertson reported for training in August 1998. Her Astronaut Candidate training included orientation briefings and tours, numerous scientific and technical briefings, intensive instruction in Shuttle and International Space Station systems, physiological training and ground school to prepare for T-38 flight training, as well as learning water and wilderness survival techniques. After completing training, she served as the office representative for the Crew Healthcare System (CHeCS), and as Crew Support Astronaut (CSA) for the ISS Expedition 2 crew.

Death

She died May 24, 2001 in Houston from burn injuries sustained in the crash of a private plane at Wolfe Air Park, Manvel, Texas on May 22, 2001; she was 38 years old. She was living at Homer City and she was scheduled to fly to the International Space Station in the following year.

Organizations
Aerospace Medicine Association
American Association of Family Practice
Experimental Aircraft Association
International Aerobatic Club
Aircraft Owners and Pilots Association

Honors and awards
NASA Performance Award
Young Investigator Award Finalist (Aerospace Medicine Association)
IUP Distinguished Alumni Award, 2000

References

Legacy
 Patricia Hilliard Robertson Center for Aviation Medicine at the Indiana Regional Medical Center.

External links
 
NTSB.gov accident report
New York Times Obituary

1963 births
2001 deaths
American astronauts
Physician astronauts
People from Houston
Aviators killed in aviation accidents or incidents in the United States
People from Indiana, Pennsylvania
Accidental deaths in Texas
Indiana University of Pennsylvania alumni
Drexel University alumni
Victims of aviation accidents or incidents in 2001
Women astronauts
American women aviators